The 2024 United States presidential election in the District of Columbia is scheduled to take place on Tuesday, November 5, 2024, as part of the 2024 United States elections in which all 50 states plus the District of Columbia will participate. District of Columbia voters will choose electors to represent them in the Electoral College via a popular vote. The District of Columbia has 3 electoral votes in the Electoral College, following reapportionment due to the 2020 United States census in which the district neither gained nor lost a seat. Per the Constitution, the District of Columbia cannot be apportioned more members of the Electoral College than the number apportioned to the state apportioned the fewest. 

Incumbent Democratic president Joe Biden has stated that he intends to run for reelection to a second term.

Primary elections

Republican convention

The District of Columbia Republican convention is scheduled to be held on June 4, 2024, alongside primaries in Montana, New Jersey, New Mexico, and South Dakota.

See also 
 United States presidential elections in District of Columbia
 2024 United States presidential election
 2024 Democratic Party presidential primaries
 2024 Republican Party presidential primaries
 2024 United States elections

References 

District of Columbia
2024
Presidential